Wang Guofa (November 1945 – 16 September 2018) was a Chinese politician who served as Vice Governor of Jilin Province and Chairman of the Jilin Provincial Committee of the Chinese People's Political Consultative Conference (CPPCC).

Biography 
Wang was born in November 1945 in Yushu, Jilin. After graduating from Northeast Forestry University in 1970, he joined the work force in August 1970 and the Communist Party of China in June 1971. 

He worked for Tonghua Textile Machinery Plant before entering politics, serving as vice mayor of Tonghua county-level city, deputy party chief of Tonghua Prefecture, and Communist Party Secretary of Tonghua prefecture-level city. 

Wang was appointed vice governor of Jilin Province in January 1993, and became a member of the Jilin provincial party standing committee in September 1997. He was promoted to deputy party secretary of Jilin in May 2000, and served as Chairman of the Jilin Provincial Committee of the CPPCC from May 2003. 

Wang was a delegate to the 13th, 14th, 16th, and 17th National Congress of the Communist Party of China, a member of the 9th National People's Congress, and a member of the 10th, 11th, and 12th National Committee of the CPPCC. 

Wang died in Beijing on 16 September 2018, aged 72.

References 

1945 births
2018 deaths
Political office-holders in Jilin
Northeast Forestry University alumni
Delegates to the National People's Congress from Jilin
Politicians from Changchun
People's Republic of China politicians from Jilin
Chinese Communist Party politicians from Jilin